INIS may refer to:

International Nuclear Information System
Iraqi National Intelligence Service
iNiS Corporation
Institut national de l'image et du son
Irish Naturalisation and Immigration Service
INIS character set

See also

 
 Innis (disambiguation)
 INI (disambiguation)